A Love Story is a 2016 animated short film directed by Anushka Kishani Naanayakkara and produced by Khaled Gad.

When you think about it, there are a lot of yarn-related phrases that are used to describe how we feel. "They tied the knot", "Relationship is settled", "I just lost the thread". A great choice of material then for Anushka Kishni Nanayakara's tactile-stop-motion short, which has a woolly head as its protagonist.

Awards

References

External links
 

BAFTA winners (films)
2016 films